Staniša Stošić (Станиша Стошић) (July 26, 1945 – April 7, 2008) was a Serbian folk singer known for melodies from his home region of Vranje in Southern Serbia, which earned him the nickname of "Serbian Pavarotti" and "Father of the southern melodies". His most popular song was Lela Vranjanka.

Biography
He was born July 26, 1945 in the village of Vrbovo near Vladičin Han.

He sang the first time in Radio Belgrade, 1963, and won the "Zlatiborski narcis" festival in 1966 with the song Stojanke, bela Vranjanke. Lela Vranjanka, a Serbian interpretation of "Miserlou" was recorded in 1972.

In 2007, he was awarded the Special Lifetime Award by the Serbian Ministry of Culture for his efforts on preserving Serbian music tradition.

Albums
Antologija vranjanskih narodnih pesama
Moje najlepše pesme

Songs
"Žal za mladost"
"Lela Vranjanka" (Dragan Toković)
"Dimitrijo, sine Mitre"
"Simbil cveće"
"Zbog tebe, mome ubava"
"Stani stani zoro"
"Otvori mi belo lenče"
"Šano dušo, Šano mori, otvori mi vrata

See also
Jordan Nikolić

References

External links
 Новости, 8.април 2008.: Умро Станиша Стошић
 Блиц, 10. април 2008.: Одлазак легенде врањског мелоса
  на сајту
 Трг у Врању добија име по Станиши Стошићу

1945 births
2008 deaths
People from Vranje
People from Vladičin Han
Serbian folk singers
20th-century Serbian male singers
Yugoslav male singers